Rusaba is an administrative ward in Buhigwe District  of Kigoma Region of Tanzania. In 2016 the Tanzania National Bureau of Statistics report there were 13,070 people in the ward, from 20,997 in 2012.

Villages / neighborhoods 
The ward has 3 villages and 20 hamlets.

 Rusaba 
 Rusaba A
 Rusaba B
 Mkatanga
 Kavumu
 Kigara
 Ndoha
 Nyarumanga
 Rabiro
 Kabuye
 Kinazi 
 Kazingu
 Kimara
 Kilembela
 Kabanga
 Mkoza
 Kimala 
 Nyambwanga
 Muruvumu
 Rugamiko
 Kamanga
 Nyamkwale
 Nyarumanga

References

Buhigwe District
Wards of Kigoma Region